RPE RP-V8  is the name of a naturally-aspirated V8 engine series developed by Radical Sportscars in Peterborough, England for use in the SR8 sportscar.  The design is loosely based on the  inline-four engine produced by Suzuki for their Hayabusa motorcycle.  The company have designed their own cylinder block and use existing Suzuki cylinder heads.  The two cylinder banks are inclined at  72-degree angle.  Lubrication is provided by a  dry sump system.  The engine is mated to a purpose-built transaxle designed by Quaife.

There are  currently two versions of the engine available, which have been updated for 2011. First is the base  model which retains the original bore and stroke of the K8 Hayabusa design and produces .

Specifications
(from Radical Sportscars)

Engine
maximum motive power: 
maximum revs: 10,500 revolutions per minute
steel flat-plane crankshaft
Twin pump lubrication system
Four scavenge pump dry sump system
Rotary vane coolant pump
Pre-engage starter motor
Belt-driven 45 amp alternator
45 mm eight-throttle body induction system

Bellhousing and clutch
Twin-plate dry clutch
Integral oil tank capacity: 
Integral rear engine mount
Engine - gearbox spacing:  
Dry weight:

Transaxle
Six-speed constant mesh manual transmission transaxle
Sequential shift - 6 forward, 1 back
Torque-biased limited-slip differential
Integral oil cooling pump
Pressure fed lubrication system

Dimensions
Length: 
Width: 
Height: 
Dry weight:

References

Automobile engines
Automotive technology tradenames
Internal combustion piston engines
V8 engines
Gasoline engines by model